This is a list of songs which reached number one on the German Media Control Top100 Singles Chart in 2006.

Number-one hits by week

See also
 List of number-one hits (Germany)
 List of German airplay number-one songs

References

External links
 charts.de
 germancharts.com

Number-one hits
Germany
2006
2006